Ralph Phillips Lowe (November 27, 1805 – December 22, 1883) was an American judge and the fourth Governor of Iowa.

Life and career

Lowe was born in Warren County, Ohio. He settled in the town of Muscatine, and was selected as a representative to the Iowa state constitutional convention in 1844. He moved to Lee County at the end of the 1840s, and became the district judge succeeding George Henry Williams. He became an Iowa state court judge in 1852. In 1857 he was nominated as the Republican candidate for Governor of Iowa, with Oran Faville as his Lieutenant. He won the election by a narrow margin (38,498 votes to 36,088) and served as Governor for two years between 1858 and 1860.

At the end of his term he was appointed as a justice of the Iowa Supreme Court, which he served as between 1860 and 1867. He resumed practicing law, and in 1874 moved to Washington, D.C., where he died on December 22, 1883. He was interred at Glenwood Cemetery.

References

Bibliography

1805 births
1883 deaths
Republican Party governors of Iowa
Iowa state court judges
Justices of the Iowa Supreme Court
People from Lee County, Iowa
People from Muscatine, Iowa
People from Warren County, Ohio
People from Washington, D.C.
Burials at Glenwood Cemetery (Washington, D.C.)
19th-century American judges
19th-century American politicians